Faizal Roslan  is a Singaporean professional footballer who play for Tanjong Pagar United FC as a defender.

In his youth day, he had played for various clubs, from Woodlands Wellington to Home United to Warriors FC etc...

Career statistics 
As of 31 Dec 2022

References

1996 births
Living people
Singaporean footballers
Association football midfielders
Singapore Premier League players
Young Lions FC players
Home United FC players
Lion City Sailors FC players